Sinister Street is a 1913–1914 novel by Compton Mackenzie. It is a kind of Bildungsroman or novel about growing up, and concerns two children, Michael Fane and his sister Stella. Both of them are born out of wedlock, something which was frowned upon at the time, but from rich parents.

In the UK, the novel was published as two volumes. However, in the United States, the volumes appeared as two separate books: Youth's Encounter (1913) and Sinister Street (1914).

Sequels
The novel had several sequels, which continue until Michael Fane's marriage:
 1917 – Guy and Pauline (published in the United States as Plashers Mead)
 1918 – The Early Life and Adventures of Sylvia Scarlett (made into the 1935 romantic comedy film Sylvia Scarlett, starring Katharine Hepburn and Cary Grant)
 1919 – Sylvia and Michael

Adaptations
The book was turned into a 1922 silent film, Sinister Street, directed by George Beranger. In 1969, it was adapted for a TV series, Sinister Street, by the BBC.

Reception
George Orwell enjoyed the book illicitly as a prep school boy at St Cyprian's School in Eastbourne where the headmistress, Mrs "Flip" Wilkes, gave a prize for the best list of books read. Cyril Connolly reported in Enemies of Promise "although I won the prize through heading my list with Thomas Carlyle's The French Revolution: A History—and Orwell won it next—we were both caught at last with two volumes of Sinister Street and our favour sank to zero." Orwell responded to Connolly with the comment, "There was a fearful row about bringing that kind of book into the school." Bowker suggests:
It was not surprising that Sinister Street should so rivet young Eric. Its hero, Michael Fane, is studying Classics at a prep school, and moves with his mother from the countryside to Kensington (close to where Orwell's Aunt Nellie lived). He spends holidays in Cornwall (as Orwell's family did), visits Bournemouth (where Orwell's Uncle Charlie lived), and meets a girl from an Anglo-Indian family whose father is away in Burma. He visits Eastbourne and thinks what a lovely place. (Hollow laughter from Blair and Connolly, no doubt). Fane envies a wild looking, unkempt boy he sees wandering down Kensington High Street and longs to be "a raggle-taggle wanderer".

Connolly also wrote critically of the book in the first section of Enemies of Promise, stating:
Nineteen fourteen was also the year of an important bad book Sinister Street. It is a work of inflation, important because it is the first of a long line of bad books, the novels of adolescence, autobiographical, romantic, which squandered the vocabulary of love and literary appreciation and played into the hands of the Levellers and Literary Puritans.

Max Beerbohm said of it:
There is no book on Oxford like it. It gives you the actual Oxford experience. What Mackenzie has miraculously done is to make you feel what each term was like.

Frank Swinnerton, literary critic, described it thus:

John Betjeman said of it, "This has always seemed to me one of the best novels of the best period in English novel writing." Henry James thought it to be the most remarkable book written by a young author in his lifetime.

References
 Linklater, Andro Compton Mackenzie: A Life The Hogarth Press (1992, London)

External links 
 

1913 British novels
1914 British novels
Novels by Compton Mackenzie
British bildungsromans
Scottish bildungsromans
Martin Secker books
British novels adapted into films